The Norwegian Sociology Canon is an award presented from 2009 to 2011 to 25 nonfiction texts that are considered to have had the greatest influence on sociology in Norway. The list of works was published in the journal of the Norwegian Sociology Association. 

The jury that created the list was composed of Willy Pedersen (chair), Andreas Hompland, Cathrine Holst, Ida Hjelde, and Ola Korsnes. The criteria for selection were "professional originality and quality, professional impact, social impact, craftsmanship and methodological soundness, and literary value."

List

References 

Literature lists
Sociology lists
Sociology awards